Burgers Park is a park located in the center of Pretoria, South Africa. Founded in the 1870s as a botanical garden, it covers four acres and has been declared a South African National Monument. It is named for Thomas François Burgers, fourth president of the South African Republic. A statue of President Burgers stands in the park. There is also a statue to the South African Scottish Regiment of the Second World War.

References

External links
  Parks in Tshwane

Parks in Pretoria
History of Pretoria